In mathematics, the chromatic spectral sequence is a spectral sequence, introduced by , used for calculating the initial term of the Adams spectral sequence for Brown–Peterson cohomology, which is in turn used for calculating the stable homotopy groups of spheres.

See also 

 Chromatic homotopy theory
 Adams-Novikov spectral sequence
 p-local spectrum

References

 

Spectral sequences